Leptoglossus is a genus of true bugs in the leaf-footed bug family and the tribe Anisoscelini. Species are distributed throughout the Americas, with some records in eastern & southern Asia and Europe (mostly introductions).  Several species are economic pests of agricultural crops. Like members of some other genera in the family, these bugs have leaflike dilations of the hind tibia. Several species are of economic importance, and one species, L. chilensis, has been reported to bite humans.

Species 
The current list of described species and subspecies includes:
Leptoglossus absconditus Brailovsky & Barrera
Leptoglossus alatus (Walker)
Leptoglossus arenalensis Brailovsky & Barrera
Leptoglossus ashmeadi Heidemann
Leptoglossus balteatus (Linnaeus)
Leptoglossus brevirostris Barber
Leptoglossus caicosensis Brailovsky & Barrera
Leptoglossus cartogoensis Brailovsky & Barrera
Leptoglossus chilensis chilensis (Spinola)
Leptoglossus chilensis concaviusculus Berg
Leptoglossus cinctus (Herrich-Schaeffer)
Leptoglossus clypealis Heidemann
Leptoglossus concolor (Walker)
Leptoglossus confusus Alayo & Grillo
Leptoglossus conspersus Stål
Leptoglossus corculus (Say)
Leptoglossus crassicornus (Dallas)
Leptoglossus crestalis Brailovsky & Barrera
Leptoglossus dearmasi Alayo & Grillo
Leptoglossus dentatus Berg
Leptoglossus dialeptus Brailovsky & Barrera
Leptoglossus digitiformis Brailovsky & Barrera
Leptoglossus dilaticollis Guérin-Méneville - type species (Central & South America)
Leptoglossus egeri Brailovsky
Leptoglossus fasciatus (Westwood)
Leptoglossus fasciolatus (Stål)
Leptoglossus flavosignatus Blöte
Leptoglossus frankei Brailovsky
Leptoglossus fulvicornis (Westwood)
Leptoglossus gonagra (Fabricius)
Leptoglossus grenadensis Allen
Leptoglossus harpagon (Fabricius)
Leptoglossus hesperus Brailovsky & Couturier
Leptoglossus humeralis Allen
Leptoglossus impensus Brailovsky
Leptoglossus impictipennis Stål
Leptoglossus impictus (Stål)
Leptoglossus ingens (Mayr)
Leptoglossus jacquelinae Brailovsky
Leptoglossus katiae Schaefer & Packauskas
Leptoglossus lambayaquinus Brailovsky & Barrera
Leptoglossus lineosus (Stål)
Leptoglossus lonchoides Allen
Leptoglossus macrophyllus Stål
Leptoglossus manausensis Brailovsky & Barrera
Leptoglossus neovexillatus Allen
Leptoglossus nigropearlei Yonke
Leptoglossus occidentalis Heidemann
Leptoglossus oppositus (Say)
Leptoglossus pallidivenosus Allen
Leptoglossus phyllopus (Linnaeus)
Leptoglossus polychromus Brailovsky
Leptoglossus quadricollis (Westwood)
Leptoglossus rubrescens (Walker)
Leptoglossus sabanensis Brailovsky & Barrera
Leptoglossus stigma (Herbst)
Leptoglossus subauratus Distant
Leptoglossus talamancanus Brailovsky & Barrera
Leptoglossus tetranotatus Brailovsky & Barrera
Leptoglossus usingeri Yonke
Leptoglossus venustus Alayo & Grillo
Leptoglossus zonatus (Dallas)

References

External links
Gibson, E. H. 1917. Key to the species of Leptoglossus Guer. occurring north of Mexico (Heteroptera: Coreidae) Psyche 24: 69–72.

Coreidae genera
Taxa named by Félix Édouard Guérin-Méneville
Anisoscelidini